Legend is a 2015 biographical crime thriller film written and directed by American director Brian Helgeland. It is adapted from John Pearson's book The Profession of Violence: The Rise and Fall of the Kray Twins, which deals with their career and the relationship that bound them together, and follows their gruesome career to life imprisonment in 1969.

This is Helgeland's fifth feature film. Tom Hardy, Emily Browning, David Thewlis and Christopher Eccleston star with Colin Morgan, Chazz Palminteri, Paul Bettany, Tara Fitzgerald and Taron Egerton as well as the singer Duffy featured in supporting roles.

Plot
In the 1960s, Reggie Kray is a former boxer who has become an important part of the criminal underground in London. At the start of the film, his twin brother Ron is locked up in a psychiatric hospital for paranoid schizophrenia. Reggie uses threats to obtain the premature release of his brother. The twins unite their efforts to control a large part of London's criminal underworld. One of their first efforts is to muscle-in on the control of a local nightclub, using extortion and brutal violence.

Reg enters into a relationship with Frances, his driver's sister, whom he eventually marries. When he is imprisoned for a previous criminal conviction, which he cannot evade, she makes him swear that he will leave his criminal life behind, an oath he never honours due to the allure of crime. While Reg is in prison, Ron's mental instability and violent temperament lead to severe financial setbacks at the nightclub. The club is almost forced to close after Ron scares away most of the customers. On the first night after Reg's release from prison, the brothers have an all-out fist fight, but they manage to partially patch things up.

The brothers are approached by Angelo Bruno of the Philadelphia crime family who, on behalf of Meyer Lansky and the American Mafia, wants to engage them in a crime syndicate deal. Bruno agrees to a fifty-fifty deal with Reg to split London's underground gambling profits in exchange for local protection by the brothers. Initially, this system is highly lucrative for the Kray brothers. Ron's barely concealed volatility results in him publicly murdering George Cornell, an associate of the Torture Gang, rivals of the Krays. As a result, Scotland Yard opens a full investigation of the Kray brothers.

Reg's marriage with Frances crumbles due to his addiction to crime. Unable to bear Reg's false promises to reform, Frances starts consuming prescription drugs illegally. After he beats and rapes her in a fit of rage, she leaves him. When Reg approaches her to reconcile, Frances seems to agree and they plan to visit Ibiza. But soon she kills herself by drug overdosage leaving Reg guilt ridden. The twins' criminal activities continue and Ron pays petty criminal Jack "the Hat" McVitie to kill Leslie Payne, Reg's partner, who controls the legal side of the Krays' operations, as he doesn't trust Payne. Jack only wounds Payne, who then turns the brothers over to Detective Superintendent Leonard "Nipper" Read, the head of the investigation. Reg finds out and brutally stabs McVitie with a knife during a party hosted by Ron. The testimony given by Payne means that Ron is arrested and charged with Cornell's murder. The final scene shows a police squad breaking down the door to Reggie's flat in order to apprehend him for McVitie's murder.

The closing captions indicate both brothers receiving criminal convictions for murder. They died five years apart, Ron from a heart attack in 1995, and Reggie from bladder cancer in 2000.

Cast
 Tom Hardy as Ronald "Ronnie" Kray and Reginald "Reggie" Kray
Identical twins who terrorised London during the 1950s and 1960s.
 Emily Browning as Frances Shea
The wife of Reggie Kray. She met Kray at 16 and married him aged 22 in 1965.
 Colin Morgan as Frankie Shea
Reggie's driver at the Kray Firm, and older brother of Frances. Described as a "young and very good-looking man."
 Christopher Eccleston as Leonard "Nipper" Read
A Detective Superintendent determined to take down the Krays.
 David Thewlis as Leslie Payne
The Krays' business manager. He considered himself a cultured man and he was sickened by the twins' violence.
 Taron Egerton as Edward "Mad Teddy" Smith
A psychopathic gay man rumoured to have had affairs with Ronnie.
 Chazz Palminteri as Angelo Bruno
The head of the Philadelphia crime family and friend and business associate to Ronnie and Reggie.
 Paul Bettany as Charlie Richardson
 Charlie and his brother Eddie were leaders of a notorious south London gang (also known as the Torture Gang), which had a feud and war with the Krays' gang 'The Firm' during the 1960s.
 Tara Fitzgerald as Mrs Shea, Frances and Frankie's mother.
 Aneurin Barnard as David Bailey
A fashion photographer in the early 1960s.
 Paul Anderson as Albert “Alby” Donoghue
The gofer of Ronnie and Reggie Kray, and Reggie's chief lieutenant.
 Duffy as Timi Yuro
 Kevin McNally as Harold Wilson
 John Sessions as Lord Boothby
 Alex Giannini as Antonio Caponigro
 Sam Spruell as Jack McVitie
 Adam Fogerty as Big Pat

Production

Development
On 12 October 2013, it was announced that Brian Helgeland had written a script and would be directing a film focusing on the life of Reggie Kray who, with identical brother Ronald, formed the notorious Kray twins. Helgeland said the film would concentrate on Reggie's attempts to control the psychopathic tendencies of his younger twin.

Helgeland spoke of hanging out in London with well-known Krays associate Freddie Foreman, saying, "I had drinks with him in his local haunt. When we finished he got up to go and they feted him at the bar. I said to him, 'what about the bill?' and he replied, 'we don't pay.'"

Helgeland attended the Cannes Film Festival with Working Title's Tim Bevan and Chris Clark to talk to potential buyers of the film and showing test footage of Hardy playing the twins.

Casting
On 18 April 2014, it was announced that Helgeland would write and direct the film, with the shooting being based in the United Kingdom and with Hardy starring as the male leads. Five days later, it was stated that Browning was in negotiations for a role as the film's female lead. Hardy was so set on playing Ronnie Kray that he proposed to Helgeland that if he gave him the role of Ronnie, Hardy would play the role of Reggie for free.

Filming
Crews and cast were spotted filming scenes at Falmouth Road, London, St Anne's Limehouse in Limehouse and in the Windmill Walk area around London Waterloo.
Filming also took place in Caradoc Street in Greenwich, in the Cedra Estate on Cazenove Road and in Gibson Gardens, both of which are in Hackney.

Principal photography started on 12 June 2014.

Release
Financing for Legend was provided by StudioCanal, which also distributed in the United Kingdom, France, New Zealand and Germany in addition to handling international sales, which started at the beginning of the Cannes Film Festival. On 30 April 2014, Cross Creek Pictures acquired the North American distribution rights to Legend from StudioCanal, with a planned 2015 theatrical release through Universal Pictures in its distribution deal with the studio. Sales to other territories such as Asia, Africa and much of Europe are being completed. The film was originally set for release in the US on 2 October 2015, but it was moved to 20 November 2015.

Legend premiered at the Toronto International Film Festival on 12 September 2015 at Roy Thomson Hall.

Marketing
On 13 June 2014, the first image of the film was published, featuring Hardy as the Kray twins. A promotional poster attracted publicity because it made a two-star review from The Guardian appear to be at least a four-star review by placing the two stars between the heads of the Krays.

Home media
Legend was released on DVD and Blu-ray in the United Kingdom on 25 January 2016 and in the United States on 1 March 2016.

Reception

Box office
, Legend has grossed $41,636,816 worldwide; $27,960,112 in the United Kingdom and $1,872,994 in North America.

Critical reception
 On Metacritic the film has a score of 55 out of 100 based on 31 critics, indicating "mixed or average reviews".

Awards and nominations

See also
 The Krays (1990 film)

References

External links
 
 
 
 
 Official screenplay

2015 films
2010s biographical films
2015 crime thriller films
2010s gang films
2015 LGBT-related films
British biographical films
British crime thriller films
British gangster films
British LGBT-related films
Crime films based on actual events
Cross Creek Pictures films
Films about murderers
Films about twin brothers
Films directed by Brian Helgeland
Films with screenplays by Brian Helgeland
Films produced by Brian Oliver
Films produced by Eric Fellner
Films produced by Tim Bevan
Films scored by Carter Burwell
Films set in London
Films set in the 1960s
Works about the Kray twins
Working Title Films films
Biographical films about criminals
Films about organised crime in the United Kingdom
Films shot at Pinewood Studios
2010s English-language films
2010s British films